Losada may refer to:

People:
Alberto Losada (born 1982), Spanish former road bicycle racer who competed professionally
Antón Losada Diéguez (1884–1929), writer, Spanish politician, member of the Irmandades da Fala of Ourense
Amalia Puga de Losada (1866-1963), Peruvian writer, poet, novelist and essayist
Carolina Losada (born 1972), Argentine politician, television presenter and journalist
Carolina Soto Losada, the High Presidential Counsellor for Government, Private Sector and Competitiveness of Colombia
Diego de Losada (1511–1569), Spanish conquistador and the founder of Santiago de León de Caracas, capital of Venezuela
Diego de Quiroga y Losada, the acting Governor of Spanish Florida 1687–1693
Diego Losada (born 1972), Uruguayan former basketball player
Eloy Tato Losada, (1923–2022), Spanish born prelate of the Roman Catholic Church
Endika Bordas Losada (born 1982), former Spanish professional footballer
Euriamis Losada (born 1983), Cuban American actor
Francisco Losada (1612-1667), Spanish composer 
Hernán Losada (born 1982), retired Argentine professional football
Isabel Losada, British writer and former actress, singer, dancer, and TV producer
Jessi Losada, American sportscaster of Cuban descent
Joan Losada (born 1992), Spanish rugby sevens player
José Manuel Losada (born 1962), professor and literary theorist specializing in myth criticism and comparative literature
Juan Armada y Losada (1861–1932), Spanish politician
Julio Losada (born 1950), former Uruguayan footballer most notable for his time spent at Greek club Olympiacos
Manuel Hermida Losada (1924–2005), known as Hermidita, Spanish former footballer
Marcial Losada (born 1939), Chilean psychologist, consultant, director of the Center for Advanced Research in Ann Arbor, Michigan
Mario Losada, Argentine politician, who served as senator and president of the UCR
Nahuel Losada (born 1993), Argentinian professional association football player
Roberto Losada (born 1976), Spanish retired footballer
Sebastián Losada (born 1967), Spanish retired footballer
Vicky Losada (born 1991), Spanish football midfielder

Geography:
Losada River, river in Colombia

Other:
Losada, a genus of wasps
Losada Line, Critical positivity ratio or Losada ratio, largely discredited concept in positive psychology
Editorial Losada, traditional Argentine publishing house founded in 1938

See also
LSDA (disambiguation)
Los Adaes
Lousada
Lousadzak

es:Losada